Vasili Nikitich Mitrokhin (March 3, 1922 – January 23, 2004) was a major and senior archivist for the Soviet Union's foreign intelligence service, the First Chief Directorate of the KGB, who defected to the United Kingdom in 1992 after providing the British embassy in Riga with a vast collection of his notes purporting to be written copies of KGB files. These became known as the Mitrokhin Archives. The intelligence files given by Mitrokhin to the MI6 exposed an unknown number of Soviet agents, including Melita Norwood.

He was co-author with Christopher Andrew of The Mitrokhin Archive: The KGB in Europe and the West, a massive account of Soviet intelligence operations based on copies of material from the archive. The second volume, The Mitrokhin Archive II: The KGB in the World, was published in 2005, soon after Mitrokhin's death.

Education
Mitrokhin was born in Yurasovo, in Central Russia, Ryazan Oblast, Russian SFSR. After leaving school, he entered artillery school, then attended university in Kazakh SSR, graduating with degrees in history and law.

Career

Military
Towards the end of the second World War, Mitrokhin took a job in prosecutor's office in Kharkiv in the Ukrainian SSR. He entered the MGB as a foreign intelligence officer in 1948. His first foreign posting was in 1952.

During the 1950s, he served on various undercover assignments overseas. In 1956, for example, he accompanied the Soviet team to the Olympic Games in Australia. Later that year, however, after he had apparently mishandled an operational assignment, he was moved from operational duties to the archives of the KGB's First Chief Directorate and told he would never work in the field again.

Disillusionment
Mitrokhin sometimes dated the beginnings of his disillusionment to Nikita Khrushchev's famous speech to the Communist Party of the Soviet Union congress denouncing Joseph Stalin, though it seems he may have been harbouring doubts for some time before that. For years, he had listened to broadcasts on the BBC and Voice of America, noting the gulf between their reports and party propaganda.

However, when he began looking into the archives, he claimed to have been shocked by what he discovered about the KGB's systematic repression of the Soviet people. "I could not believe such evil", he recalled. "It was all planned, prepared, thought out in advance. It was a terrible shock when I read things."

Between 1972 and 1984, he supervised the move of the archive of the First Chief Directorate from the Lubyanka to the new KGB headquarters at Yasenevo. While doing so, he made handwritten copies and immensely detailed notes of documents from the archive. He retired in 1985.

Defection
During the Soviet era, Mitrokhin made no attempts to contact any Western intelligence services. After the dissolution of the Soviet Union in 1991, he traveled to Latvia with copies of material from the archive and walked into the American embassy in Riga. Central Intelligence Agency officers there did not consider him to be credible, concluding that the copied documents could have been faked. He then went to the British embassy and a young diplomat there saw his potential. Following a further meeting one month later with representatives of the Secret Intelligence Service (MI6), operations retrieved the 25,000 pages of files hidden in his house, covering operations from as far back as the 1930s. He and his family were then exfiltrated to the United Kingdom, even though authorities of Yeltsin's Russia were not impeding the free travel abroad of active or retired members of secret services or members of their families.
Richard Tomlinson, the MI6 officer imprisoned in 1997 for attempting to publish a book about his career, was one of those involved in retrieving the documents from containers hidden under the floor of the dacha.

Mitrokhin Archive
These works are collectively referred to as the Mitrokhin Archives.

Vasili Mitrokhin and Christopher Andrew, The Sword and the Shield: The Mitrokhin Archive and the Secret History of the KGB, Basic Books (1999), hardcover, ; trade paperback (September 2000), 
Vasili Mitrokhin and Christopher Andrew, The World Was Going Our Way: The KGB and the Battle for the Third World, Basic Books (2005) hardcover, 677 pages 

Vasiliy Mitrokhin, KGB Lexicon: The Soviet Intelligence Officer's Handbook, Frank Cass & Co. Ltd (2002), 451 pages, 
"Chekisms", Tales of the Cheka, A KGB Anthology, Compiled and introduced by Vasiliy Mitrokhin. "Чекизмы". The Yurasov Press (2008), 435 pages, . (The book could be obtained from any copyright library).

Other publications
Mitrokhin, Vasiliy Nikitich, The KGB in Afghanistan, English Edition, introduced and edited by Christian F. Ostermann and Odd Arne Westad, Woodrow Wilson International Center for Scholars, Cold War International History Project, Working Paper No. 40, Washington, D.C., February 2002.

See also
 Mitrokhin Archive
 List of Eastern Bloc defectors
 List of KGB defectors

ReferencesSources'''
 The Times, January 29, 2004 
 The Daily Telegraph'', February 2, 2004

External links
The Mitrokhin Archive from the Cold War International History Project

The Papers of Vasiliy Mitrokhin held at Churchill Archives Centre

1922 births
2004 deaths
People from Ryazansky District, Ryazan Oblast
KGB officers
Soviet military personnel of World War II
Soviet intelligence personnel who defected to the United Kingdom
Soviet archivists
Historians of espionage
Russian non-fiction writers
Soviet spies
Cold War spies